The Badia a Settimo or Abbazia dei Santi Salvatore e Lorenzo a Settimo is a Cluniac Benedictine abbey in the comune of Scandicci, near Florence in Tuscany, Italy. It was founded in 1004.

On 18 March 1236, by order of Pope Gregory IX, the monastery passed to the Cistercians of the abbey of Galgano Guidotti.

In the chapel of San Jacopo of the Badia, which dates to 1315, are frescoes, much ruined, that are the only surviving work attributed with reasonable certainty – by Ghiberti – to Buffalmacco, whose real name was Bonamico or Buonamico.

See also
Abbot of Cluny

References

Further reading
 Giovanni Lami  (1758) Sanctae Ecclesiae Florentinae Monumenta. Firenze: Tipografia Salutati.
 Ildefonso da San Luigi (1770–1786) Delizie degli eruditi toscani. Firenze: Tipografia Cambiagi.
 Emanuele Repetti (1833–1846) Dizionario geografico, fisico, storico del Granducato di Toscana. Firenze.
  (1855) Dizionario corografico-universale dell'Italia sistematicamente suddiviso secondo l'attuale partizione politica d'ogni singolo stato italiano. Milano: Editore Civelli.
 Attilio Zuccagni-Orlandini (1857) Indicatore topografico della Toscana Granducale. Firenze: Tipografia Polverini.
 Cesare Paoli (1889) Il Libro di Montaperti (MCCLX). Firenze: Viesseux.
 Luigi del Moro (1895) Atti per la conservazione dei monumenti della Toscana compiuti dal 1 luglio 1893 al 30 giugno 1894; relazione a S.E. il Ministro della Pubblica Istruzione. Firenze: Tipografia Minori corrigendi.
  (1896) Atti per la conservazione dei monumenti della Toscana compiuti dal 1 luglio 1894 al 30 giugno 1895; relazione a S.E. il Ministro della Pubblica Istruzione. Firenze: Tipografia Minori corrigendi.
 Guido Carocci (1906) I dintorni di Firenze. Firenze: Tipografia Galletti e Cocci.
 Mario Salmi (1927) Architettura romanica in Toscana. Milano; Roma: Bestetti & Tumminelli.
 Pietro Guidi, Martino Giusti (1942) Rationes Decimarum Italiae. Tuscia. Le decime degli anni 1295-1304. Città del Vaticano: Biblioteca Apostolica Vaticana.
 Enrico Fiumi (1950) La demografia fiorentina nelle pagine di Giovanni Villani. Firenze.
 Mario Salmi (1958) Chiese romaniche della campagna toscana. Milano: Electa.
  (1961) Chiese romaniche della Toscana. Milano: Electa.
 Robert Davidsohn (1956–1968) Storia di Firenze. Firenze: Sansoni editore.
 Carlo Celso Calzolai (1970) La Chiesa Fiorentina. Firenze: Tipografia Commerciale Fiorentina.
 Italo Moretti, Renato Stopani (1974) Architettura romanica religiosa nel contado fiorentino. Firenze: Salimbeni.
 Renato Stopani (1979) Il contado fiorentino nella seconda metà del Duecento. Firenze: Salimbeni.
 [various authors] (1980) Toscana paese per paese. Firenze: Bonechi.
 Alessandro Conti (1983) I dintorni di Firenze: arte, storia, paesaggio. Firenze: La Casa Usher.
 Giulio Villani Cirri (1993) La Chiesa Fiorentina. Storia Arte Vita pastorale. Firenze: LEF.
 Marco Frati (1997) Chiesa romaniche della campagna fiorentina. Pievi, abbazie e chiese rurali tra l'Arno e il Chianti. Empoli: Editori dell'Acero. |.
 Cristina Acidini (2000) I dintorni di Firenze. Milano: Mondadori. .
 [various authors] (2001) Firenze. Milano: Touring Club Italiano. .

Monasteries in Tuscany
1004 establishments in Europe
11th-century establishments in Italy